Verdelot may refer to :

 Philippe Verdelot (1480 to 1485 –  1530 to 1532?), French composer of the Renaissance
 Verdelot, Seine-et-Marne, a French commune in the Seine-et-Marne département